The French Open is a Grand Slam tennis tournament in Paris, France. It may also refer to:
 Individual iterations of the tennis tournament, listed at :Category:French Open
 French Open (badminton), a major badminton tournament
 Individual iterations of this event, listed at :Category:French Open (badminton)
 French Open (darts), a major darts tournament
 French Open (chess), an alternative name for the French Defence opening
 Open de France, a European Tour golf tournament

See also 
 French Championship (disambiguation)